Dino Cassio (2 April 1934 - 9 July 2012) was an Italian actor and singer. He appeared in more than sixty films from 1964 to 2008.

Selected filmography

References

External links 

1934 births
2012 deaths
Italian male film actors